The Delphin Classics or Ad usum Delphini was a series of annotated editions of the Latin classics, intended to be comprehensive, which was originally created in the 17th century.

The first volumes were created in the 1670s for Louis, le Grand Dauphin, heir of Louis XIV (“Delphini” is the Latinization (genitive) of  Dauphin), and were written entirely in Latin. Thirty-nine scholars contributed to the series, which was edited by Pierre Huet with assistance from several co-editors, including Jacques-Bénigne Bossuet and Anne Dacier. The main features included the main Latin texts; a paraphrase in the margins or below in simpler Latin prose (an ordo verborum); extended notes on specific words and lines, mainly about history, myth, geography, or natural sciences; and indices. One useful pedagogical feature of this series is that it keeps students reading and working in the target language (Latin).

The original volumes each had an engraving of Arion and a dolphin, accompanied by the inscription in usum serenissimi Delphini (for the use of the most serene Dauphin). The collection includes 64 volumes published from 1670 to 1698.  

Beginning in 1819, a different series of Latin classics was published in England under the name Valpy's Delphin Classics by Abraham John Valpy. That series was edited by George Dyer, who produced 143 volumes; it shares little or nothing in common with the earlier, French series, notwithstanding the name.  The French Dauphin Classics continued to be published contemporaneously with Valpy's, serving in classrooms across Europe and the Americas; the first American edition was published in Philadelphia, PA in 1804 while one European edition was published in Bassan as late as 1844.

The expression Ad usum Delphini was sometimes used on other texts which had been expurgated because they contained passages considered inappropriate for the youth, and has been used pejoratively to indicate any work expurgated for the sake of younger audiences, and not just this series of Latin texts and commentaries.

Publishing history
(Taken from Volpilhac-Auger p. 214.)

Reception and influence
The Ad usum Delphini collection was referred to by E.T.A. Hoffmann in Lebensansichten des Katers Murr (1819).
 „Sie sind, unterbrach ihn der Prinz, ein spaßhafter Mann.“ — Ganz und gar nicht, fuhr Kreisler fort, ich liebe zwar den Spaß, aber nur den schlechten, und der ist nun wieder nicht spaßhaft. Gegenwärtig wollt' ich gern nach Neapel gehen, und beim Molo einige gute Fischer- und Banditenlieder aufschreiben ad usum delphini. (English translation: "You are, the prince interrupted, a jolly man." - Not at all, Kreisler continued, I love fun, but only bad, and it's not fun again. At present I would like to go to Naples and write down some good fishermen's and bandit songs ad usum delphini at the Molo.)
The Ad usum Delphini collection was referred to by Edward Bulwer-Lytton in Devereux, Book IV (1829):
let me turn to Milord Bolingbroke, and ask him whether England can produce a scholar equal to Peter Huet, who in twenty years wrote notes to sixty-two volumes of Classics, for the sake of a prince who never read a line in one of them?"
"We have some scholars," answered Bolingbroke; "but we certainly have no Huet.  It is strange enough, but learning seems to me like a circle: it grows weaker the more it spreads.  We now see many people capable of reading commentaries, but very few indeed capable of writing them."

Honoré de Balzac III: Ève et David, later Les souffrances de l'inventeur, (1843):
History is of two kinds--there is the official history
taught in schools, a lying compilation ad usum delphini; and there is
the secret history which deals with the real causes of events--a
scandalous chronicle. 

There is a reference to the Delphin Classics in Part I, Chapter 5 of Thomas Hardy's Jude the Obscure (1895), where young Jude, trying to educate himself by reading while delivering bread from a horse and cart,

"plunge[s] into the simpler passages from Caesar, Virgil, or Horace [. . .] The only copies he had been able to lay hands on were old Delphin editions, because they were superseded, and therefore cheap. But, bad for idle school-boys, it did so happen that they were passably good for him."

References

External links
PDFs of Ad Usum editions  (DEAD LINK) (19th century versions published by A. J. Valpy and by Nicolaus Eligius Lemaire)
Delphin Classics on Encyclopaedia Britannica

17th-century Latin books
Censorship
Classics publications
Series of books